AORA's Solar Flower Tower is a hybrid power generator that utilizes solar and alternative fuels, including diesel fuel, natural gas, liquefied natural gas, biogas, and other biofuels, to provide a constant green power source targeted for community-sized production. A module, dubbed the Solar Flower Tower because it looks like a golden yellow tulip, creates about 100 kW of electricity. The basis of the design is to use solar heated compressed air to spin a micro turbine. What makes the micro turbine unique is the efficiency of smaller power blocks, which allows small-scale construction, meaning simpler operation and less land needed.

AORA

Formerly known as EDIG Solar, AORA is an Israeli based company that develops solar-hybrid power generators. The EDIG group of companies has contracted engineering project with organizations such as Ministry of Defense (Israel), El Al Israel Airlines, and the National Health Service Provider. EDIG presently has a relationship with the Weizmann Institute of Science, providing engineering services. It was at the Weizmann Institute of Science where the solar thermal technology was developed. After the technology was licensed to EDIG, continued advancement was developed until they decided to turn their new solar division into a sub-company, EDIG Solar, now known as AROA.

How the tower works

In half an acre of land (about 40% of a football field), a solar tower module is surrounded by thirty heliostats reflecting the sun ray into a special solar receiver inside the module. The receiver heats the turbine's compressed air to about 1,000 °C, and the heated air is sent into the turbine's expander to create electricity.

See also

 Active solar
 Solar energy
 Solar power
 Solar power in Israel
 Solar power tower

References

External links 
 E.D.I.G. Construction Management website
 AORA Solar raises $5m for solar thermal technology
 Green Prophet Sees Aora's Solar Flower Power Fire Up in the Desert
 Tulips in the Desert Aora Solar Air cycle with biofuel backup (Interview with Dr Pinchas Doron of Aora Solar attached)

Solar power